In storage area networking, Fabric OS is the firmware for Brocade Communications Systems's Fibre Channel switches and Fibre Channel directors. It is also known as FOS.

First generation
The first generation of Fabric OS was developed on top of a VxWorks kernel and was mainly used in the Brocade Silkworm 2000 and first 3000 series on Intel i960. Even today, many production environments are still running the older generation Silkworm models.

Second generation
The second generation of Fabric OS was developed on a PowerPC platform, and uses MontaVista Linux, a Linux derivative with real-time performance enhancements. With the advent of MontaVista, switches and directors have the ability of hot firmware activation (without downtime for Fibre Channel fabric), and many useful diagnostic commands.

According to free software licenses terms, Brocade provides access to sources of distributed free software, on which Fabric OS and other Brocade's software products are based.

Additional licensed products
Additional products for Fabric OS are offered by Brocade for one-time fee. They are licensed for use in a single specific switch (license key is coupled with device's serial number). Those include:
 Integrated Routing
 Adaptive Networking: Quality of service, Ingress Rate Limiting
 Brocade Advanced Zoning (Free with rel 6.1.x)
 ISL trunking
 Ports on Demand
 Extended Fabrics (more than 10 km of switched fabric connectivity, up to 3000 km)
 Advanced Performance Monitoring (APM)
 Fabric Watch
 Secure Fabric OS (obsolete)
 VMWare VSPEX integration

Versions
 Fabric OS 9.x
 9.0: Traffic optimizer, Fabric congestion notification
 Fabric OS 8.x
 8.2: NVMe capable + REST API
 8.1:
 8.0: Contains many new software features and enhancements as well as issue resolutions
 Fabric OS 7.x
 7.4: Switch to Linux 3.10 kernel
 7.3:
 7.2:
 7.1:
 7.0:
 Fabric OS 6.x
 6.4:
 6.3: Fillwords 2 and 3 introduced in Fabric OS 6.3.1a
 6.2: Virtual Fabrics-capable
 6.1: M-EOS compatibility enhancements
 6.0: LDAP support
 Fabric OS 5.x
 5.3: Switch to Linux 2.6 kernel
 5.2:
 5.1: Access Gateway mode
 5.0:
 Fabric OS 4.x
 4.4:
 4.3:
 4.2:
 4.1: SSH support, Multiple user access
 4.0:
 Fabric OS 3.x
 Fabric OS 2.x

References

Fibre Channel
Internet Protocol based network software